Say Yes to the Dress is a television programme with an American version and an Australian one. The UK version started on the TLC channel in 2016. In 2017, it featured the reality TV personality, Olivia Buckland. The first series was in 2016, the second series was in 2017.

It is presented by Welsh fashion designer David Emanuel, who designed Princess Diana's wedding dress.

References

External links

2010s British reality television series
2016 British television series debuts
TLC (TV network) original programming
Wedding television shows
Television shows set in Essex
English-language television shows
Wedding dresses